The Court in Stanton Drew, Somerset, England dates from 1753 and is a Grade II* listed building. It is now used as a nursing home. The walls and piers around this property are themselves Grade II listed. It is now used as a nursing home.

History

The house was built in 1753 and incorporated some features from a previous building. It underwent significant remodelling in the 19th century.

Architecture

The limestone front of the three-storey building has five bays. The central doorway has doric pilasters supporting a segmental pediment.

The  of grounds include mature trees and herbaceaous borders. There is also a vegetable garden and fruit trees. It is opened for the National Gardens Scheme.

Nursing Home

The building has been converted into a nursing home. It was inspected by the Care Quality Commission in November 2015 and rated as requiring improvement. In 2018 the CQC rated the home as good.

References

Buildings and structures completed in 1753
Grade II* listed buildings in Bath and North East Somerset
Grade II* listed houses in Somerset
Nursing homes in the United Kingdom
1753 establishments in England